KPBG may refer to:

 KPBG (FM), a radio station (90.9 FM) licensed to serve Oroville, Washington, United States
 Plattsburgh International Airport (ICAO code KPBG)